Operation Neptune was a programme of commemorative events and activities held in New Zealand throughout the year 2016 to celebrate the 75th anniversary of the establishment of the Royal New Zealand Navy in 1941.

The name “Operation Neptune” was chosen to commemorate the greatest single loss sustained by the New Zealand Navy.  was being prepared for transfer to the Royal New Zealand Navy when she sank after hitting an enemy minefield in the Mediterranean on 19 December 1941 with the loss of all but one man, including all 150 of the New Zealanders who had already joined the ship.

History
Initially established as a division of the Royal Navy in the early 1900s, it was not until 1 October 1941, that His Majesty King George VI approved the designation “Royal New Zealand Navy” for the regular element of the New Zealand Naval Forces; including Reserve and Volunteer Reserve elements.

Events

Through year
On 22 January, the Devonport Naval Base was opened to the public for the first time in two years.

The year-long celebrations started on 8 February, when the Royal New Zealand Navy performed a 'Navy Formation Entry' into Auckland Harbour, declaring the start of the Naval Celebrations. The formation included a 17-gun salute undertaken by  whilst passing by the Devonport Naval Base. The salute was to celebrate the appointment of the new-Chief of Navy John Martin, OMNZ

On 20 February 90 sailors stationed on  completed a march through Rangiora, New Zealand.

Through March,  organised a public visit to Gisborne, New Zealand, and hosted two local high schools on deck, Illminster Intermediate School and Tairawhiti Services Academy, before attending the local boys and girls high schools, Gisborne Boys' High School and Gisborne Girls' High School to speak about careers in the Navy.

On 1 October, The New Zealand Naval Ensign was flown on the Auckland Harbour Bridge to commemorate the 75th Anniversary of the Royal New Zealand Navy. It was passed through Auckland by-law's that the Naval Ensign will fly on the Harbour Bridge every 1 October from 2016 onward.

Naval plays
The Royal New Zealand Navy has commissioned Lt. Cdr. Mark Hadlow with the creation of two theatrical plays, The Complete History of the Royal New Zealand Navy, a light-hearted look at the Navy and its history, and Commander Claire and Pirates of Provence, a play for children.

The play, The Complete History of the Royal New Zealand Navy runs for about an hour and a quarter and focuses on the Naval History from Captain Cook to the present day celebrations of Operation Neptune. The play includes William Edward Sanders’ encounter with a German U-boat and it is delivered entirely in jack-speak – navy slang – with a translation thrown in. Also in the play, within the WWII portion, it features the Battle of the River Plate, with a hilarious comparison of gun sizes before the German raider is brought down to size.

International naval review weekend

Participation
Ships from Australia, Canada, Cook Islands, Chile, China, India, Indonesia, Japan, Samoa, Singapore, South Korea, Tonga, and the United States have started arriving to help the Navy celebrate its milestone.  Brunei, France, Germany, Papua New Guinea, Thailand, Timor Leste, the United Kingdom, and Vietnam are also sending representatives to the celebration but not ships.

New Zealand

All active ships of the Royal New Zealand Navy will be participating, as well as two Kaman SH-2G Super Seasprite naval helicopters and one Lockheed P-3 Orion Naval plane.

Australia

United States
On 21 July 2016, it was announced that then-Vice President Joe Biden, while on a diplomatic visit to New Zealand, had accepted an invitation for a US Naval vessel to visit New Zealand and participate in the 75th Anniversary celebrations. This was surprising to the New Zealand public due to the fact that the United States of America had not sent any of its Naval forces to New Zealand since 1987.

It was announced on 18 October 2016 that the United States would send  along with full-crew of roughly 310 soldiers.

Kaikoura earthquake
Several ships attending the anniversary were re-deployed, by their respective Governments, to help with the 2016 Kaikoura earthquake recovery efforts. These Ships are New Zealand's HMNZS Te Kaha, HMNZS Canterbury, HMNZS Endeavor, and HMNZS Wellington. International fleet include, United States Navy ship , Royal Australian Navy ship , and Royal Canadian Navy ship .

On 15 November, the Japanese Navy and Singaporean Government's request to help was granted by the Acting Minister of Civil Defense, Gerry Brownlee.

References

Royal New Zealand Navy
2016 in New Zealand